Oliver Salt Company was a saltworks located on the San Francisco Bay adjacent to Hayward, California, which produced salt by evaporation from the San Francisco Bay Area. The remains of their facilities are within Eden Landing Ecological Reserve.

See also
Don Edwards San Francisco Bay National Wildlife Refuge
Leslie Salt

References

External links

History of the San Francisco Bay Area
Saltworks
Companies based in Hayward, California
Defunct manufacturing companies based in the San Francisco Bay Area
History of Hayward, California